Peter Ash (born 4 February 1985) is an English actor from Newton Heath, Greater Manchester who has starred in British television series such as Casualty, Footballers' Wives, Hollyoaks  and Coronation Street.

Early life
He attended Xaverian College in Rusholme, Manchester.

He first started acting in school plays and with local am dram theatre groups.

Career
His first TV acting role was in Blue Murder in 2003, which helped him land a bigger role in Casualty later, playing Keith Jowell in six episodes.

He was 18 when he started playing Darius Fry in Footballers' Wives, between 2003 and 2006.

In 2005, he was in Street Trilogy at Warwick Arts Centre in Coventry.

He was a participant in the 2013–2015 UK tour of War Horse, at The Lowry theatre.

He has had guest appearances in The Street and The Royal.

In April 2018, he played Harley Frater's (Mollie Lambert) acquaintance Ron in Channel 4 soap opera, Hollyoaks.

In 2018, Ash appeared in Coronation Street, briefly portraying the character Paul Foreman, David Platt's (Jack P. Shepherd) cellmate in Highfield Prison. In 2019, he returned to Coronation Street. Paul was later revealed to be the estranged twin brother of Gemma Winter (Dolly-Rose Campbell). He won 2020 National Television Award for Best Newcomer.

Personal life
He is a second cousin of fellow actor William Ash.
In 2014, he was living in Mossley.

Filmography

Film

Television

References

External links

People from Moston, Manchester
Living people
1985 births
English male television actors